Japyginus is a genus of diplurans in the family Japygidae.

Species
 Japyginus breviforceps Silvestri, 1930

References

Diplura